Chaetostoma sovichthys is a freshwater species of catfish in the family Loricariidae and the genus Chaetostoma. It is a demersal fish native to tropical South America, where it occurs in the basins of the Motatán River and Lake Maracaibo in Venezuela. It reaches 7.2 cm (2.8 inches) SL. The species reportedly prefers a pH of 6.0 to 7.0 and a temperature of 23 to 27°C (73 to 80°F).

References

sovichthys
Fish described in 1944